Stade Beaucairois is a French football club based in Beaucaire, Languedoc-Roussillon. It was founded in 1908 as Beaucaire Olympique. The club currently plays in the Championnat National 3.

External links
  

Association football clubs established in 1908
1908 establishments in France
Sport in Gard
Football clubs in Occitania (administrative region)
Beaucaire, Gard